Chen Chien-ping is a Taiwanese banker.

Career 
Chen is the CEO of Fengbao Asset Management Co. Ltd. He held a management role with the Ta Chong Bank, which in 2015 was acquired by Taiwan Cooperative Bank.

See also 
 Chen Chi-chuan

References

Year of birth missing (living people)
Living people
Taiwanese people of Hoklo descent
Taiwanese bankers
Kaohsiung Members of the Legislative Yuan
Kuomintang Members of the Legislative Yuan in Taiwan
Members of the 2nd Legislative Yuan
20th-century Taiwanese politicians
Chen family of Kaohsiung